Iolaus longicauda, the long-tailed sapphire, is a butterfly in the family Lycaenidae. It is found in Ivory Coast and Nigeria.

Adults have been recorded in August.

Subspecies
Iolaus longicauda longicauda (Nigeria: Cross River loop)
Iolaus longicauda haydoni Collins & Larsen, 2000 (Ivory Coast)

References

Butterflies described in 1959
Iolaus (butterfly)